Captain Frank Douglas Stevens  (7 April 1893 – ) was a British First World War flying ace credited with five aerial victories.

Military service
Stevens was commissioned as a temporary second lieutenant in the infantry on 22 September 1914. He served briefly in the 9th (Service) Battalion, Suffolk Regiment, before being seconded for service with the Motor Machine Gun Service on 21 November 1914, and was later transferred to the General List. He was promoted to lieutenant on 1 March 1915.

Stevens joined the Royal Flying Corps to serve as an gunner/observer, being appointed a flying officer (observer) on 21 June 1916, but soon trained a pilot, and was appointed a flying officer on 21 November 1916. He was posted to No. 20 Squadron RFC, to fly the F.E.2d two-seater fighter, where he gained his first victory on 3 May 1917 by driving down "out of control" an Albatros D.III. On 9 June 1917 he was appointed a flight commander, with the acting rank of captain, and gained his remaining four victories, all D.IIIs driven down, between 17 May and 16 August 1917. His observer/gunners included fellow ace Lieutenant William Cambray.

On 1 April 1918, the Army's Royal Flying Corps and the Royal Naval Air Service were merged to form the Royal Air Force, and Stevens was appointed a captain in the new service that day. On 21 July 1918 he was appointed an acting-major.

List of aerial victories

Post-war career
After the end of the war, on 21 March 1919, Stevens was transferred to the RAF unemployed list, and on 3 June, in the King's Birthday Honours, he was made an Officer of the Order of the British Empire "in recognition of distinguished services rendered during the War".

On 7 July 1921 he married Eva May, youngest daughter of William Gore of Sandymount, Dublin, at Sandymount Presbyterian Church.

References

Bibliography

1893 births
Year of death missing
People from Kingston upon Thames
Suffolk Regiment officers
Motor Machine Gun Service officers
Royal Flying Corps officers
British World War I flying aces
Royal Air Force personnel of World War I
Officers of the Order of the British Empire
Military personnel from Surrey
British Army personnel of World War I